Companhia Paulista de Estradas de Ferro (also called Companhia Paulista de Vias Férreas and Fluviais) was a Brazilian railway company located in the state of São Paulo. It was known for its high standard of quality in customer service.

It remained in activity from August 1872 until October 1971, when it was extinguished and incorporated into FEPASA - Ferrovia Paulista S/A.

History

Jundiaí–Rio Claro 
The railway was idealized, in 1864, by a group of farmers, traders and capitalists who needed a means of draining the coffee grown in the interior of the state of São Paulo. They intended that São Paulo Railway, "Ingleza" or "Santos–Jundiaí", would take their rails to São João do Rio Claro (current Rio Claro), since it held the concession for that.

The decision to found the company came after the São Paulo Railway declared that it would not be possible to extend the railway further, not even to the city of Campinas, due to the losses with the Paraguayan War. The tracks of the São Paulo Railway only reached Jundiaí. In this city began to build the railways of the company towards the interior of São Paulo.

The president of the province of São Paulo at the time, Saldanha Marinho, had a fundamental role in the founding of the company in 1868, bringing together in the same ideal the capitalists and farmers who were fighting for political interests at that time.

The Companhia Paulista was then founded on 30 January 1868, under the presidency of Clemente Falcão de Sousa Filho, but construction work on the line began more than a year after that date, after the approval of the statutes of Companhia Paulista by Imperial Government.

Rio Claro–São Carlos
Its tracks advanced inland, reaching Rio Claro in 1875 and Descalvado in 1876. However, its growth was put in check when Paulista did not accept to bend to political interests that required the extension of São Carlos to pass through the Morro Pellado (current Itirapina) to attend the influential farmers, based in neighboring Itaqueri da Serra and also in the so-called "Itaqueri de Baixo".

Likewise, due to political criteria, in the management of Laurindo Abelardo de Brito as president of the province of São Paulo, Paulista was prevented from extending its lines to Ribeirão Preto, which ended up in Descalvado.

This extension was granted to the Companhia Mogiana, in an evident "breach" of its original layout. Then, the Companhia Rio Claro was founded, which took the extension concession to São Carlos and Araraquara, with an extension to Jaú and Bauru departing from Itirapina. by the engineer Antonio Francisco de Paula Souza.

Some years later, it was proposed by the Companhia Rio Claro that belonged to the Count of Pinhal and to the Major Benedito Antonio da Silva, the merger of Rio Claro and Paulista, however, the proposed bases for such a transaction were not accepted by Paulista, through its then-president Fidêncio Nepomuceno Prates, despite the recommendation of members of its technical staff who inspected the facilities of Companhia Rio Claro, for the merger to take place.

Soon after, Companhia Rio Claro was sold to "The Rio Claro São Paulo Railway Company", headquartered in London, which provided the line with several improvements and extensions.

Due to rumors of a possible merger of "The Rio Claro" with Mogiana, the board of directors of Paulista, through its president Antônio da Silva Prado authorized the purchase of "The Rio Claro" in the year of 1892, for the sum of 2,775,000 pounds, with a loan of £2,750,000 obtained in London and £25,000 at the time of purchase.

Expansion
In 1891, Paulista acquired two small 0.60m gauge railways that approached Rio Claro and Mogiana: Companhia Descalvadense and Companhia Ramal Ferreo de Santa Rita.

From there, Paulista was able to extend its inland lines, becoming tributaries of a very rich sector of the state limited between the Peixe and Mojiguaçu rivers, also having tributaries such as Companhia Douradense, Noroeste do Brasil, Estrada de Ferro Araraquara, São Paulo-Goiás, Mogiana, Funilense and Ramal Férreo Campineiro.

Upon receiving the lines from the Rio Claro Railway on April 1, 1892, Companhia Paulista divided its network into two sections: Paulista, which had 1.6m gauge lines and two small 0.6m gauge lines, and Rio Claro, with all the metre-gauge lines.

After that, Paulista developed and much, the infrastructure received from the English, expanding and improving the Stations, such as those in Rio Claro (which was completely rebuilt, with large garages) and São Carlos (which had many expansions and the installation of metallic armor of its wide station) and the stone support of the permanent way, among other items of great importance.

The company has always lent support to its tax companies such as the Dourado, São Paulo-Goyaz/Pitangueiras, Jaboticabal, Morro Agudo, and Barra Bonita companies, going so far as to acquire, since the 1930s, shareholdings of those railways. One of them, Pitangueiras, which had previously been integrated by incorporation into São Paulo-Goyáz and later, near bankruptcy, organized under the name of Companhia Ferroviária São Paulo-Goyáz, sold in 1927 to Paulista, its Pitangueiras Section, so that the trunk line could use the layout of the original Pitangueiras, from Passagem to Ibitiuva and from there to Bebedouro, as the most suitable option for extending the 1,6m gauge from Rincão to Barretos and later to the Porto Cemitério (later Colômbia), on the banks of Rio Grande. Believing in the potential of the livestock industry in the north of the state, Paulista organized with third parties the Companhia Frigorífica e Pastoril (CFP), which was later transferred to foreign capital, originated by S.A. Frigorífico Anglo.

Modernisation
Using in-depth studies by the engineer Francisco de Monlevade, Inspector General of the company, he started from 1920, the electrification of the lines, at the voltage of 3 KVCC, extending the use of "white coal" on the trunk line from Jundiaí to Campinas (1922) and from there to Rio Claro (1926). Aware of Monlevade's maxim that "if he did not electrify his lines, he would not distribute any more dividends", he extended this remarkable improvement from Rio Claro to Rincão (1928) and, in the Jaú Branch, from Itirapina to Jaú (1941) and from there to Pederneiras (1947) and Bauru (1948). The limit of this advance was given between Bauru and Cabrália-Paulista in 1954, the year of the delivery of the widening of the gauge in the line from Bauru to Marília. It is interesting to note that studies pointed to the extension of electrification to Tupã, even indicating that the Piracicaba and Descalvado branches would be electrified, reaching the latter, at least, to Pirassununga Station. The extension of electrification to Garça was started but later abandoned and, the other steps were limited to studies only.

Notes

References

 BEM, Sueli Ferreira de. Contribuição para estudos das estações ferroviárias paulistas. 1998. Dissertação (Mestrado em Estruturas Ambientais Urbanas) - Faculdade de Arquitetura e Urbanismo, Universidade de São Paulo, São Paulo, 1998. link.
 CAMPOS, Cristina de. Ferrovias e saneamento em São Paulo. O engenheiro Antonio de Paula Souza da rede de infra-estrutura territorial urbana paulista, 1870-1893. 2007. Tese (Doutorado) - Faculdade de Arquitetura e Urbanismo, USP, São Paulo, 2007. link.
 CAVALCANTI, F. R. "Companhia Paulista de Estradas de Ferro: Uma ferrovia modelo no Brasil". In: Centro-Oeste, s.d. link.
 DEBES, Célio. A caminho do Oeste: História da Companhia Paulista de Estradas de Ferro. São Paulo: Indústria Gráfica Bentivegna Editôra, 1968.
 GRANDI, Guilherme. Café e Expansão Ferroviária: A Companhia E. F. Rio Claro (1880-1903). São Paulo: Annablume/FAPESP, 2007
 GRANDI, Guilherme. Estado e capital ferroviário em São Paulo: a Companhia Paulista de Estradas de Ferro entre 1930 e 1961. 2010. Tese (Doutorado em História Econômica) - Faculdade de Filosofia, Letras e Ciências Humanas, Universidade de São Paulo, São Paulo, 2011. link.
 GIESBRECHT, R. M. "Estações Ferroviárias do Estado de São Paulo". In: Estações Ferroviárias do Brasil, s.d link.
 INOUE, L. M. Fim da Linha? Vilas ferroviárias da Companhia Paulista (1868-1961): uma investigação sobre história e preservação. Tese (Doutorado em Arquitetura e Urbanismo) - Faculdade de Arquitetura e Urbanismo - USP, 2016. link.
 PÉREZ, Filemón. Album Illustrado da Companhia Paulista de Estradas de Ferro. São Paulo, 1918. 5 partes: 1, 2, 3, 4, 5.
 PINTO, Adolfo Augusto Pinto. Minha Vida: Memórias de um Engenheiro Paulista. São Paulo: Conselho Estadual de Cultura, 1969.
 PINTO, Adolfo Augusto Pinto. História da Viação Pública de São Paulo (Brasil). São Paulo: Tipografia de Vanorden, 1903.
 SEGNINI, L. R. P. Ferrovia e ferroviários: uma contribuição para a analise do poder disciplinar na empresa. São Paulo: Ed. Autores Associados; Cortez Ed., 1982. link.
 TASSI, Rafael Prudente Corrêa. Locomotivas elétricas da Companhia Paulista de Estradas de Ferro: Electric locomotives of the Paulista Railway Company. Rio de Janeiro: Memória do Trem, 2015.

External links
 Página com material sobre a ferrovia
 Ramais da Paulista
 Eletrificação nas ferrovias brasileiras
 Cartões-postais e álbuns de lembranças
 Locomotivas elétricas da Cia.

Defunct companies of Brazil
Companies based in São Paulo
Railway companies of Brazil